Pan Hung-ming (born 29 October 1992) is a Taiwanese male slalom canoeist. He won Silver medal in Canoeing at the 2014 Asian Games in Men's slalom K-1 category.

References

 

1992 births
Living people
Taiwanese male canoeists
Asian Games medalists in canoeing
Canoeists at the 2014 Asian Games
Asian Games silver medalists for Chinese Taipei
Medalists at the 2014 Asian Games